Bernoulli is a lunar impact crater that is located in the northeast part of the Moon. It lies to the south of the crater Messala, and east of Geminus.

This formation is nearly circular with several slight outward bulges around the perimeter. There is a sunken depression along part of the southern wall, forming an outward triangular bulge in the rim. The rim is highest along the eastern side, climbing to 4 km. At the midpoint of the crater floor is a central peak formation.

Satellite craters 

By convention these features are identified on lunar maps by placing the letter on the side of the crater midpoint that is closest to Bernoulli.

See also 
 2034 Bernoulli, minor planet
 Bernoulli family

References 

 
 
 
 
 
 
 
 
 
 
 
 

Impact craters on the Moon